Juan Martín del Potro was the defending champion but decided not to compete.
Tommy Haas won the title, defeating Robin Haase in the final, 6–3, 4–6, 6–4.

Seeds
The first four seeds received a bye into the second round.

Draw

Finals

Top half

Bottom half

Qualifying

Seeds
The first three seeds received a bye into the second round.
{{columns-list|colwidth=30em|
  Ryan Harrison (second round)
  Adrian Ungur (qualifying competition)
  Ruben Bemelmans (qualified)
  Mirza Bašić (qualified)
  Jaroslav Pospíšil (qualifying competition, lucky loser)
  Márton Fucsovics (qualifying competition)
  Miloslav Mečíř Jr. (qualified)
  Ilija Bozoljac (qualified)}}

Qualifiers

Lucky losers
  Jaroslav Pospíšil'''

Qualifying draw

First qualifier

Second qualifier

Third qualifier

Fourth qualifier

References
 Main Draw
 Qualifying Draw

Erste Bank Open - Singles
2013 Singles
Erste Bank Open Singles